The  is a  commuter line operated in Japan by the private railway operator Keikyu.

There is a switchback at Keikyū Kamata for direct train services between Yokohama Station and Haneda Airport.

Service types 
Keikyu operates the following different types of service, including all-stations "Local" trains.

Abbreviations:
 Lo = : Stops at all stations
 AE = 
 LE = 
 LE = 
 A =

Station list

History 

The entire line was double-tracked in 1910.

The line was built to transport the visitors of Anamori Inari Shrine which was located in front of Anamori Station. Keihin Railway built a baseball park, tennis court, swimming pool, amusement park nearby to help increase the users of the line.

The line was the primary rail route to Haneda Airport(via Anamori Station) until 1945, when the airport was taken over by the United States Armed Forces. The line was converted back to single track in order to make way for a parallel freight line. Service to the airport island resumed on 20 April 1956 when the line was extended to a new Haneda Airport Station (present-day Tenkūbashi Station), and from 1 November 1963 the line was renamed the Airport Line. It was not commonly used to access the airport for many years, as frequencies were limited and no through services to central Tokyo were offered, in comparison to the Tokyo Monorail which provided direct service from Hamamatsucho to the airport terminal beginning in 1964.

Haneda Airport was significantly expanded with a new terminal in 1993, and Keikyu received government permission to serve the new terminal as the monorail alone was deemed to have inadequate capacity. From 18 November 1998, the Airport Line was extended from Tenkūbashi to Haneda Airport Station (present-day Haneda Airport Domestic Terminal Station), allowing direct service between the airport and major stations such as Shinagawa and Yokohama. Haneda Airport International Terminal Station opened on 21 October 2010.

Keikyu teamed up with Sega to decorate a special limited edition "Sonic the Hedgehog/Puyo Puyo" train which ran on the Keikyu Airport line from 14 November 2016 to 17 December 2016 to celebrate the 25th anniversary for both games. The train was part of the Keikyu 2100 series' "Keikyu Blue Sky Train" livery and featured images of Sonic, Tails, Knuckles, Amy, Shadow, Silver, Eggman and Carbuncle as well as a collection of the game's expressive stacking blobs. In addition, signs at the Airport Line's Otorii Station, the closest stop to the site of Sega's original office prior to 2018, were featuring special images honoring the games.

Expansion 
Service levels are expected to be increased following the completion of tail tracks at Haneda Airport Terminal 1·2 Station.

See also
 List of railway lines in Japan

References 

 
Airport Line
Railway lines in Tokyo
Airport rail links in Japan
1067 mm gauge railways in Japan
4 ft 6 in gauge railways in Japan
Standard gauge railways in Japan
Haneda Airport
Railway lines opened in 1902
1902 establishments in Japan